The NCAA on CBS is the branding used for NCAA college football, college basketball, college baseball, college softball and college lacrosse on CBS and CBS Sports Network.

College football

CBS has been televising college football games since it launched a sports division. CBS currently airs college football coverage from the SEC (since 1996),Navy (since 2005), Mountain West (since 2006), Army (since 2009), Mid-American Conference (since 2015) and Conference USA (since 2018). CBS also has the rights to the Sun Bowl (since 1968), and the Army–Navy Game (since 1996).

CBS also holds the rights to the Conference USA Football Championship Game (airing on CBSSN) and SEC Championship Game (airing on CBS).

While all SEC on CBS games air on CBS, only select Mountain West games (especially those involving Boise State and Air Force), select Army games and select Navy games air on CBS, all other games either air on CBS Sports Network or Facebook.

The Army-Navy game and the Sun Bowl always air on CBS.

College basketball

CBS has been televising college basketball since 1966. CBS currently airs college basketball coverage from the American Athletic Conference (since 2013), Atlantic 10 Conference (since 2013), Big 12 Conference (since 2012), Big East Conference (since 2013), Big Ten Conference (since 1991), Conference USA (since 2018), Colonial Athletic Association (since 2017), Mid-American Conference (since 2015), Missouri Valley Conference (since 2005), Mountain West Conference (since 2006), Pac-12 Conference (since 2012), Patriot League (since 2002), SEC (since 1996), Southern Conference (since 2021), and West Coast Conference (since 2019). CBS also holds the rights to the CBS Sports Classic (since 2014), and the partial rights to March Madness (since 1982).

The CBS produced American Conference, Big 12, Big Ten, and Pac-12 basketball games all air on CBS, select Missouri Valley Conference, Mountain West Conference and Big East games also air on CBS. All other CBS produced college basketball games air on CBS Sports Network or Facebook.

The Missouri Valley Conference men's basketball tournament championship, Mountain West Conference men's basketball tournament, Atlantic 10 Conference men's basketball tournament championship, and Big Ten Conference men's basketball tournament championship air on CBS. The Conference USA men's basketball tournament championship and Mid-American Conference men's basketball tournament championship air on CBS Sports Network.

CBS shares the rights to the NCAA Division I men's basketball tournament with Turner Sports. CBS airs the Final Four and national championship games every other year.

College hockey
CBS Sports has aired college hockey since 2002. Currently, CBS Sports Network airs college hockey from the National Collegiate Hockey Conference (since 2012).

College baseball

CBS Sports has aired college baseball since 1988. CBS Sports Network currently airs college baseball from the Patriot League and Conference USA.

College softball
CBS Sports Network currently airs college softball from Conference USA.

College lacrosse
CBS Sports Network currently airs college lacrosse from the Patriot League.

References

External links

CBS Sports